The Yeocomico River is a  tidal tributary of the southern portion of the Potomac River in Virginia's Northern Neck. The Yeocomico forms the boundary between Westmoreland and Northumberland counties. Yeocomico is a Native American name roughly translated as "tossed to and fro by the waters." Others suggest it is an Algonquian word that means "four dwelling places" since the river has a branch on either side with each dividing into two large forks.

The Yeocomico River forms at the confluence of three rivers: the Northwest Yeocomico, the West Yeocomico, and the South Yeocomico rivers.

During the War of 1812, the Royal Marines Battalions raided the entrance to the Yeocomico River, which concluded with the capture of four schooners at the town of Kinsale, Virginia (August 1814).

Tributaries 
Northwest Yeocomico River
Shannon Branch
White Point Creek
West Yeocomico River
Kinsale Branch
Hampton Hall Branch
Long Cove
Wilkins Creek
South Yeocomico River
Mill Creek
Drum Cove
Lodge Creek
Dungan Cove
Palmer Cove
Cornish Creek
Parkers Creek

See also 
List of Virginia rivers

References

Rivers of Northumberland County, Virginia
Rivers of Virginia
Rivers of Westmoreland County, Virginia
Tributaries of the Potomac River